Thomas Pringle (born 30 August 1967) is an Irish Independent politician who has been a Teachta Dála (TD) for the Donegal constituency since the 2016 general election, and previously from 2011 to 2016 for the Donegal South-West constituency.

Early life
Pringle was born into an Irish Republican family. His father, Peter, was a supporter of the Irish Republican Socialist Party, and was convicted of the killing of two members of the Gardaí in 1980, a conviction that was subsequently declared as unsafe, although it has not been certified as a miscarriage of justice. He is a patron of the People's Movement, which campaigned against the Lisbon Treaty. He previously worked for Donegal County Council, where he managed a water treatment plant and was a shop steward. Pringle is married and has three children.

Pringle was previously a member of Donegal County Council, having been elected as an independent member in 1999, and then as a Sinn Féin candidate in 2004. He left Sinn Féin in 2007, and retained his seat as an independent in 2009.

Dáil Éireann (2011–present)
Pringle was elected as a TD for the Donegal South-West constituency at the 2011 general election, unseating the incumbent Tánaiste Mary Coughlan. He quickly became an ally of Luke 'Ming' Flanagan, elected as an independent TD at the same time as Pringle, but for the Roscommon–South Leitrim constituency. Flanagan and Pringle would go on to support each other on many issues, including reform of the Common Agricultural Policy (CAP) and opposition to the MERCOSUR deal. Even when Flanagan was elected as an MEP for the Midlands–North-West constituency after spending three years in the Dáil, himself and Pringle continued to work together, and Flanagan visited Donegal to canvass for Pringle ahead of the 2020 general election.

On 5 December 2011, Pringle delivered a televised address to the nation, representing the technical group of TDs in Dáil Éireann. He did so in response to Taoiseach Enda Kenny's Address to the nation of the previous evening. Later that month, Pringle called on people for support in a campaign not to pay a new household charge brought in as part of the latest austerity budget, and announced that he would not register for the tax or pay it.

In February 2012, he published his expenses online. He was elected leader of the Technical group in Dáil Éireann in March 2012.

In May 2012, Pringle brought an unsuccessful High Court challenge over the 2012 European Fiscal Compact referendum and the ESM Treaty which was appealed to the Supreme Court in July 2012. In July 2012, the Irish Supreme Court decided to refer three questions to the Court of Justice of the European Union arising out of his challenge to the European Stability Mechanism Treaty and doubts about the legality under the European treaties of the ESM. The CJEU held an oral hearing on the referral on 23 October 2012. The full court of 27 members sat in an historic sitting, it was the first time that the full court sat to hear a reference from a member state of the Union and heard oral arguments from counsel for Pringle, Ireland, nine member states, the Commission, the Council, and the European Parliament. On 27 November 2012, the EU Court of Justice dismissed all arguments of Thomas Pringle.

In the 2016 general election, after a re-drawing of constituency boundaries, Pringle campaigned in the new five-seater Donegal constituency. He was re-elected to the final seat by a margin of just 184 votes over Sinn Féin's Pádraig Mac Lochlainn. During negotiations to form a government, Pringle said he was glad not to have signed up to the Independent Alliance, after that group entered talks with Taoiseach Enda Kenny. Pringle said that unless Kenny or Fianna Fáil leader Micheál Martin signed up to Right2Change, he would not support either as Taoiseach.

As of April 2016, Pringle had become a member of the Independents 4 Change technical group in the Dáil.

In May 2016, Pringle introduced legislation designed to retain water in public ownership and avoid further privatisation. 

Pringle put forward a bill calling on the government to end public spending from fossil fuels, which passed, making Ireland the first country to fully divest public money from fossil fuels. In June 2022, Pringle put forward a bill proposing a referendum on lowering the voting age to 16.

References

External links

 

1967 births
Living people
Alumni of Galway-Mayo Institute of Technology
Alumni of Letterkenny Institute of Technology
Independent TDs
Irish tax resisters
Local councillors in County Donegal
Members of the 31st Dáil
Members of the 32nd Dáil
Members of the 33rd Dáil
Politicians from County Donegal
Sinn Féin politicians